is a Japanese voice actress and singer from Kanazawa, Ishikawa. She is under the Lantis and Vi-vo Recording Label and famous as the voice of Milfeulle Sakuraba in the Galaxy Angel Series. She also sang along with Yukari Tamura, Miyuki Sawashiro, Mayumi Yamaguchi and Mika Kanai as the group Angel-Tai.

Filmography

Dubbing
The Big Bang Theory, Penny (Kaley Cuoco)
Greta, Erica Penn (Maika Monroe)

Discography

Singles 
2003-08-27: 
2003-09-26: 
2003-10-22: ray of sunshine
2004-09-23: 
2004-11-26: Wonderstory/HAPPY END
2005-03-02:  — theme song for Damekko Doubutsu anime television series
2005-10-05: Happiest Princess — opening theme for White Princess the second PS2 game
2006-05-24: CANDY☆POP☆SWEET☆HEART — ending theme for Hime-sama Goyoujin anime television series
2007-06-27: The Lost Symphonies
2008-05-21: crossing days - ending theme for Kure-nai anime television series
2008-10-22: 
2009-06-03: ReTIME
2009-11-25: Piece of love
2010-03-24: Magic Spell
2010-10-06: HONEY TEE PARTY!
2011-10-26: Euphoric Prayer
2012-02-14: AUTOMATIC SENSATION
2010-08-24: HOSHI

Albums 
2003-03-07: 
2004-04-28: 
2005-05-25: Pretty Good!
2006-11-15: 
2007-12-19: Wonderful World
2009-02-18: Marching Monster
2011-06-22: Unlocker
2013-08-14: Blooming Line

Compilations 
2007-02-14: The Great bambi Pop Swindle
2011-02-09: BEST BAMBI BOX

Other 
2004-12-22: 
2005-07-21: 
2005-08-24: 
2005-10-26: 
2006-04-05:

DVD 
2005-06-29: 
2005-12-21: 
2007-06-27:

References

External links 
 

1981 births
Living people
Anime singers
Japanese women pop singers
Japanese-language singers
Japanese video game actresses
Japanese voice actresses
Musicians from Ishikawa Prefecture
People from Kanazawa, Ishikawa
Voice actresses from Ishikawa Prefecture
21st-century Japanese actresses
21st-century Japanese singers
21st-century Japanese women singers